Daniel Donald "D.D." Wozniak, Sr. (August 26, 1922 in Silver Lake, Minnesota – August 17, 2005) was a Minnesota lawyer, politician, and judge, who served as Chief Judge of the Minnesota Court of Appeals.

Early life and education
Wozniak was born in Silver Lake, Minnesota and graduated from Central High School in Minneapolis, Minnesota. Wozniak served as a naval aviator during World War II. He graduated with a degree in economics from the University of St. Thomas in 1943, and received his law degree from the University of Minnesota in 1948. Wozniak was elected to the Minnesota House of Representatives in 1951, a position he would hold for 14 years. Described as a "maverick Democratic-Farmer-Labor Party activist," Wozniak would later serve in the foreign service for President Lyndon Johnson. Wozniak was appointed as one of the first judges on the newly created Minnesota Court of Appeals in 1982. He was later appointed Chief Judge in 1987. Wozniak held the position until 1992, when he resigned due to reaching the state's mandatory retirement age. Wozniak died in 2005.

References

Minnesota Law Library reference

St. Thomas University (Florida) alumni
University of Minnesota Law School alumni
Minnesota lawyers
Minnesota Court of Appeals judges
1922 births
2005 deaths
People from McLeod County, Minnesota
Military personnel from Minnesota
20th-century American judges
United States Navy pilots of World War II
20th-century American lawyers
Democratic Party members of the Minnesota House of Representatives